Tawaramoto Station (田原本駅) is a train station on Kintetsu Kashihara Line in Tawaramoto, Nara, Japan.

Lines 
 Kintetsu Railway
 Kashihara Line

Platforms and tracks

History
 1923—Tawaramoto Station was opened by the Osaka Electric Tramway as the Unebi Line was extended from Hirahata to Kashiharajingu-mae Station.
 1941—Owned by the Kansai Express Railway that merged with the Sangu Express Railway.
 1944—Owned by the Kinki Nippon Railway that merged with the Nankai Railway, the station was renamed as Kinki Nippon Tawaramoto Station.
 1964—Kinki Nippon Tawaramoto Station was renamed its current name.
 1990—The platforms were extended, and the crosswalk between the platforms was removed as the station building was renovated.
 1992—Automatic ticket gates were installed.
 Apr. 1, 2007—PiTaPa, a reusable contactless stored value smart card, has been available.
 2009—The west entrance was added.

External links
 

Railway stations in Japan opened in 1923
Railway stations in Nara Prefecture
Tawaramoto, Nara